Old Dominion Electric Cooperative (ODEC) is an electric generation and transmission cooperative headquartered in Glen Allen, Virginia. ODEC provides wholesale power to its 11 member electric cooperatives in the states of Virginia, Maryland, and Delaware in the United States. ODEC generates its electricity from coal, fuel oil, natural gas, and nuclear energy.

On February 23, 2018, ODEC named Marcus Harris as the organization's next president and CEO. Prior to joining ODEC, he served as executive vice president and CEO of Kansas Electric Power Cooperative.

About
ODEC is an electric generation and transmission cooperative that provides wholesale power to its 11 member electric cooperatives in Virginia, Maryland, and Delaware. Through these member cooperatives, ODEC provided over 11 million megawatt hours of power to 1.4 million people in 2008.  ODEC's member cooperatives primarily distribute power to rural, suburban, and recreation areas.

ODEC's generating facilities make use of coal, fuel oil, natural gas, and nuclear energy. ODEC owns 11.6% of the North Anna Nuclear Generating Station in Louisa County, Virginia. ODEC President Jack Reasor in 2007 stated that ODEC does not support a cap on carbon emissions as proposed by the United States Carbon Cap-and-Trade Program. In 2009, ODEC proposed building a coal plant in Dendron, Virginia. In 2010, ODEC agreed to purchase the output of the Criterion Wind Project under a 20 year contract.

Northern Virginia Electric Cooperative was a member of the cooperative until 31 December 2008, when it terminated its contract.

TEC Trading is a Class B member of Old Dominion and is owned by ODEC's member cooperatives.  TEC purchases excess power from Old Dominion and sells it on the market.

Members
 A&N Electric Cooperative
 BARC Electric Cooperative
 Choptank Electric Cooperative
 Community Electric Cooperative
 Delaware Electric Cooperative
 Mecklenburg Electric Cooperative
 Northern Neck Electric Cooperative
 Prince George Electric Cooperative
 Rappahannock Electric Cooperative
 Shenandoah Valley Electric Cooperative
 Southside Electric Cooperative

References

Further Reading and Recent News
"Surry Board of Supervisor approves controversial coal plant" Daily Press, Feb. 5, 2010 

"Surry power plant now faces last local hurdle" Daily Press, Feb. 2, 2010 

"Facing objections, company eyes second power plant site" The Virginian-Pilot, Jan. 31, 2010 

"Consider power plant from regional perspective" Tidewater News, Jan. 30, 2010 

"IOW wants more information on proposed coal plant" Tidewater News, Jan. 23, 2010 

"Surry Coal Plant Pros and Cons" Richmond Times Dispatch, May 17, 2009 

"Proposed coal plant clears another hurdle" Daily Press, Dec. 16, 2009 

"Virginia's Energy Future-Energy on land" HearSay with Cathy Lewis, WHRV FM, Feb. 26, 2010

External links
 Official website

Electric generation and transmission cooperatives in the United States
Companies based in Virginia
Energy companies established in 1948
1948 establishments in Virginia